Eidsfjorden is a fjord in Nordland county, Norway. It branches off of the main Vesterålsfjorden which is part of Norwegian Sea. The innermost part of the fjord is part of Sortland Municipality. The outer part of the fjord is split with the western coast belonging to Bø Municipality and the eastern coast belonging to Hadsel Municipality.

Several small fjords branch north from the fjord: Jørnfjord, Hellfjord, Melfjord, Olderfjord, and Bjørndalsfjord.

There are two churches located along the fjord: Indre Eidsfjord Church and Ytre Eidsfjord Church (meaning "inner" and "outer" Eidsfjord churches). Norwegian County Road 820 runs along the inner shore of the fjord.

See also
 List of Norwegian fjords

References

Fjords of Nordland
Bø, Nordland
Hadsel
Sortland